Quantico Middle High School is a public secondary school on Marine Corps Base Quantico, and in unincorporated Prince William County,  Virginia. It is a part of the Department of Defense Education Activity (DoDEA).

History
It originated from the Quantico Post School, an elementary through high school on the base. A dedicated secondary school building opened in 1962. The sixth grade was moved to Quantico High in 1988. Quantico Middle School was administratively separated in 1989 with a new separate entrance, but the middle and high schools combined into Quantico Middle High School in 1997.

By 2011 the DOD considered the Quantico Middle High building to be in a "failing" condition. Plans were there for a new building to open in 2015, with a price tag of $44.8 million. However, this building has been delayed and has still not opened as of 2021.

Student body
Quantico Middle/High School had 300 students enrolled as of 2015, which has lead to smaller than average class sizes.

In 2020 it had about 350 students.

References

Further reading

External links
 Quantico Middle High School
 Quantico Middle + High School - VMDO (architectural firm page about the construction)

Department of Defense Education Activity
Public middle schools in Virginia
Public high schools in Virginia
Schools in Prince William County, Virginia